Management & Science University (abbreviated as MSU Malaysia or simply MSU) is a private university in Malaysia located in Shah Alam, Selangor. The university was founded in 2001 as University College of Technology & Management Malaysia before officially becoming a full fledge university in October 2007 as Management & Science University. 
 
Management & Science University is a member of the MSU Holdings which comprises MSU College, Management & Science Institute, MSU Kids, MSU Medical Centre, MSU Foundation, Sekolah Bina Insan MSU Foundation, Jakarta Institute of Technology and Health, and Ilmu Ekonomi Penguji High School.
 
MSU has been accorded ‘Excellent Status University’ twice on the national university-rating system, and named the ‘Best Entrepreneurial Private University’ by the Ministry of Higher Education Malaysia. As an applied and enterprise university, MSU offers programmes of study at postgraduate, undergraduate, and foundation levels, through connected pathways that admit students from all walks of life and personal backgrounds.

A graduate tracer study by the Ministry of Higher Education Malaysia (MoHE) shows 98.6% of MSU graduates secure employment within six months of their graduation. MSU was ranked at 541 to 550 in the 2020 QS World University Rankings and 271 in the 2019 QS Asia University Rankings that makes MSU among top 51% world's best universities and top 1.8% Asia's best universities respectively. MSU was also ranked at 301+ in the 2019 Times Higher Education World University Impact Rankings.

Facilities

Academic facilities 
 Cyber Lab
 Lecture Theatres
 Audio Recording Studio & Audio Editing Laboratory
 Computer Labs
 Classrooms & Lecture Halls

Medical centre 
The MSU Medical Centre is a 14 levels private specialist hospital in Shah Alam, operated by MSU itself.

Accommodation 
Management & Science University Shah Alam campus has one hostel for on-campus student accommodation.

 The Residence @ MSU

The hostel offers other services such as 24-hour multi-level security, resident housemaster, housekeeping services, recreational areas, shared kitchen, laundromat and maintenance support. Additional accommodation is available off-campus, located within the vicinity of the campus and the Shah Alam area.

Academic profile

Faculties and schools  
Management & Science University offers more than 100 programs: diplomas, bachelors, masters, PhDs, skill-base and professional programmes. As of 2019, fields major offered by Management & Science University are:

International Medical School
 Medicine and Surgery
 Medical Sciences
 Science Biology

Faculty of Health and Life Sciences 

 Healthcare Professional
 Optometry & Visual Science
 Diagnostic & Allied Health Science

Faculty of Business Management and Professional Studies 

 Accounting and Finance
 Business Management & Law

Faculty of Information Science & Engineering 

 Media Science & Graphic
 Engineering & Technology
 Information Sciences & Computing

School of Pharmacy 

 Pharmacy
 Traditional Chinese Medicine
 Science in Pharmaceuticals Technology

School of Education of Social Sciences 

 Education
 Public Relations & Entertainment Management
 Literature Studies
 Psychology
 Early Childhood Education

School of Hospitality and Creatives Arts 

 Hospitality, Tourism & Events
 Culinary Arts & Food Studies
 Music Technology
 Fashion Design
 Patisserie Arts
 Spa Management
 Beauty Management
 Leisure Outdoor and Adventure Management
 Event Management

School of Graduate Studies 

 Computer, Applied, Biomedical Science
 Food Service Technology
 Information Technology 
 Pharmacy
 Design

Graduate School of Management 

 Fashion Management
 International Business
 Accounting/Finance
 Management
 Education

University rankings

Times Higher Education (THE) 
In 2019, Management & Science University made inaugural participation within the Times Higher Education World University Rankings, starting with the Times Higher Education University Impact Rankings. MSU holds the following position within the Times Higher Education Rankings:

 Ranked #301+ in the Times Higher Education University Impact Rankings in 2019
 Ranked #201–300 in Times Higher Education Impact Rankings: Good Health and Well-being for People in 2019
 Ranked #201 in Times Higher Education Impact Rankings: Decent Work and Economic Growth in 2019
 Ranked #101–200 in Times Higher Education Impact Rankings: Reducing Inequalities in 2019
 Ranked #100–200 in Times Higher Education Impact Rankings: Gender Equality in 2019
 Ranked #301 in Times Higher Education Impact Rankings: Partnership for Goals in 2019

Quacquarelli Symonds (QS) 
Since 2018, Management & Science University has been ranked within the Quacquarelli Symonds Rankings, starting with the QS Asia University Rankings. MSU holds the following positions within the QS Rankings and QS Rating:

 Ranked #541-550 in the QS World University Rankings 2020
Ranked #271 in the QS Asia University Rankings 2019
Ranked #217 in the QS Asia University Rankings 2018
 Rated 5 Stars in teaching, facilities, graduate employability, social responsibility, and inclusiveness

Malaysia Quality Agency (MQA) 

 The MQA is responsible for the Rating for Higher Education Institutions in Malaysia (SETARA) and the Discipline-Based Rating System (D-SETARA).

Other recognition 

 In 2016, Management & Science University was awarded Best in Education for Leadership and Human Capital Development by Asia Pacific Brands Foundation
 In 2016, Management & Science University was awarded Best Entrepreneurial Private University by Ministry of Higher Education Malaysia
 UK's Accreditation Service for International Colleges (ASIC): Management & Science University achieved the Premier University status
 Malaysia Tourism Council: Gold Award School of Tourism and Hospitality in 2017

Transportation
The university is connected to the  LRT Kelana Jaya line via  Glenmarie LRT station by RapidKL feeder bus T774 LRT Glenmarie ↺ MSU as well as  KTM Port Klang line via  Batu Tiga Komuter station by SmartSelangor bus SA02 MBSA / Hentian Bandar Shah Alam ↺ KTM Batu Tiga via MSU. 

The university can be accessed by the  LRT Shah Alam line  Stadium Shah Alam LRT station once the line starts operating in 2024.

International partners

Australia 

 University of Newcastle
 University of Canberra
 Victoria University of Technology

Czech Republic 

 Charles University

India 

 MS Ramaiah Medical College

Indonesia 

 Universitas Andalas
 Universitas Gadjah Mada
 Universitas Airlangga

Japan 

 Tokyo University of Technology

New Zealand 

 Otago University

Poland 

 Medical University of Warsaw

South Africa 

 University of the North (UNIN)

Switzerland 

 DCT International Business & Hospitality School

United Kingdom 
 Middlesex University
 Anglia Ruskin University
 University of Manchester
 University of Northumbria
 Sunderland University
 University of Wales, Bangor
 University of East London
 Coventry University

United States 

 Armstrong Atlantic State University
 University of California

See also 
 List of universities in Malaysia

References

External links 

 
 
 

Universities and colleges in Selangor
Hospitality schools in Malaysia
Design schools in Malaysia
Information technology schools in Malaysia
Medical schools in Malaysia
2001 establishments in Malaysia
Private universities and colleges in Malaysia
Educational institutions established in 2001